The 6th annual Billboard Latin Music Awards which honor the most popular albums, songs, and performers in Latin music took place in Miami.

Hot latin track artist of the year 

 Alejandro Fernández
 Ricky Martin
 Marc Anthony
 Elvis Crespo

Hot latin track of the year 
 "Por Mujeres Como Tú", Pepe Aguilar
 "Vuelve", Ricky Martin
 "Yo Nací Para Amarte", Alejandro Fernández
 "No Sé Olvidar", Alejandro Fernández

Pop

Pop album of the year, Male
"Vuelve", Ricky Martin 
 "Cosas del Amor", Enrique Iglesias
 "Carlos Ponce", Carlos Ponce
 "Atado a Tu Amor", Chayanne

Pop album of the year, female
"Dónde Están los Ladrones?", Shakira
 "Te Acordarás de Mí", Olga Tañon
 "El Color de los Sueños", Fey
 "Todo El Amor", Myriam Hernández

Pop album of the year, duo or group
"15 Años Después...", El Reencuentro
 "Entrega Total", Onda Vaselina
 "Ana José Nacho", Mecano
 "Viento A Favor", Sentidos Opuestos

Pop album of the year, new artist
"Carlos Ponce", Carlos Ponce
"15 Años Después...", El Reencuentro
 "Entrega Total", Onda Vaselina
 "Vida Loca", Francisco Céspedes

Pop latin track of the year
"Vuelve", Ricky Martin
"Lo Mejor de Mí", Cristian Castro
 "No Sé Olvidar", Alejandro Fernández
 "Yo Nací Para Amarte", Alejandro Fernández

Tropical/Salsa

Tropical/salsa album of the year, male
"Suavemente", Elvis Crespo
"Un Segundo Sentimiento", Charlie Zaa
"Ironías", Víctor Manuelle
"Exclusivo", Toño Rosario

Tropical/salsa album of the year, female
"Vive", Milly Quezada
"Atada", Gisselle
"Con los Pies Sobre la Tierra", Melina León
"No Lo Voy a Olvidar", Brenda K. Starr

Tropical/salsa album of the year, duo or group
"Ni es lo mismo ni es igual", Juan Luis Guerra
"The Dynasty", Grupo Manía
"Los Primera", Servando & Florentino
"Yo Voy Por Ti", Karis

Tropical/salsa album of the year, new artist
"Suavemente", Elvis Crespo
"Los Primera", Servando & Florentino
"Leyenda II", Alquimia
"Lo mejor de la vida ", Compay Segundo

Tropical/salsa latin track of the year
"Suavemente", Elvis Crespo
"Tu Sonrisa", Elvis Crespo
"Contra la Corriente", Marc Anthony
"Que Habría Sido de Mí", Víctor Manuelle

Regional Mexican

Regional Mexican album of the year, male
"Entre El Amor Y Yo", Vicente Fernández  
"Con Mariachi", Pepe Aguilar
"Puro Pueblo", Michael Salgado
"Canta A José Alfredo Jiménez", Pedro Fernández

Regional Mexican album of the year, female
"Cerca de ti", Lucero
"Arráncame A Puños", Yesenia Flores
"Robame Un Beso", Graciela Beltrán
"Instantes", Patricia Navidad

Regional Mexican album of the year, duo or group

"Como Te Recuerdo", Los Temerarios
"Amor Platónico", Los Tucanes de Tijuana
"Los Super Seven", Los Super Seven
"Confesiones De Amor", Los Ángeles Azules

Regional Mexican album of the year, new artist

"Los Super Seven", Los Super Seven
"Ayer, Hoy y Siempre...Con Amor", Los Trios
"Tu Ya Lo Conoces", Julio Preciado
"Arráncame A Puños", Yesenia Flores

Regional Mexican latin track of the year

"Por que te conocí", Los Temerarios
 "Por Mujeres Como Tú", Pepe Aguilar
"Me Haces Falta Tú", Los Ángeles Azules
"Me Voy A Quitar De En Medio", Vicente Fernández

Other awards

Latin Fusion/Alternative album of the year
"Ozomatli", Ozomatli
"The Album II", Alabina
"The New Sound of the Venezuelan Gozadera", Los Amigos Invisibles
"Bloque", Bloque

Latin rock album of the year
"Sin Daños a Terceros", Ricardo Arjona
"La Flaca", Jarabe de Palo
"Nek", Nek
"A Quien Le Pueda Interesar", Fiel a la Vega

Latin rap album of the year
"Aquel Que Había Muerto", Vico C
"En La Mira", Ilegales
"Aquamosh", Plastilina Mosh
"¿Dónde Jugarán las Niñas?", Molotov

Contemporary Latin jazz album of the year
"Hot House", Arturo Sandoval
"Bele Bele en la Habana", Chucho Valdés
"Obsession", David Sánchez
"Afro-Cuban Fantasy", Poncho Sanchez

Latin dance club play of the year
"Oye!", Gloria Estefan
"No Nos Tenemos (NNT)", Proyecto Uno
"Zulu", Francisco Paz
"Suavemente", Elvis Crespo

Latin dance album of the year
"Latin Mix Usa", Various Artist
"Verano 98", Various Artist
"Latinos In Da House, Vol 2.", Various Artist
"D.J. Latin Mix 98", Various Artist

Latin dance maxi-single of the year
"Suavemente", Elvis Crespo
"The Cup of Life", Ricky Martin
"Oye!", Gloria Estefan
"Corazón Partío", Alejandro Sanz

Songwriter of the year
Kike Santander
Juan Gabriel
Fato
Omar Alfanno

Publisher of the year
F.I.P.P. Music
EMI April
BMG Songs
Sony Discos Music Publishing

Publishing corporation of the year
F.I.P.P. Music
EMI Music
Sony/ATV Music
Warner/Chapell Music

Producer of the year
Emilio Estefan
"Kike Santander"
"Rudy Pérez"
"Pepe Aguilar"

Spirit Of Hope
Olga Tañon

Billboard Lifetime achievement award
Flaco Jiménez

Billboard Latin Music Hall of Fame
Rocio Durcal

References

Billboard Latin Music Awards
Latin Billboard Music Awards
Latin Billboard Music Awards
Billboard Music Awards
Latin Billboard Music